Chuck Morrell (born ) is an American college football coach and former player. He is the co-defensive coordinator and safeties coach at the University of Washington. He was the safeties coach at Fresno State from 2020 to 2021. Before that, he spent nine years as the head coach for Montana Tech. He attended Sioux Falls, was part of Kalen DeBoer's coaching staff during a five-year run in which Sioux Falls won three NAIA Football National Championships.

Playing career
Morrell grew up in Tyndall, South Dakota and attended Bon Homme High School. His father, Russ Morrell, was the long-time head football coach and one of the winningest coaches in South Dakota high school history. He was recruited out of high school by University of Sioux Falls head coach Bob Young, but initially attended the University of South Dakota before transferring to Sioux Falls. His undergraduate track was pre-medical, and he planned to become a doctor.

Morrell played safety for the Sioux Falls Cougars from 1995 through 1997. The 1996 team won the NAIA Division II Football National Championship, the final such title before the NAIA eliminated divisions. Morrell led his team in tackles that year. Among his teammates in those years was Kalen DeBoer, then a wide receiver.

Coaching career
Morrell graduated from Sioux Falls in 1998 and Bob Young offered him a position on his staff as a defensive assistant. After one year, Young promoted him to defensive coordinator. DeBoer, after a stint as a high school coach, joined the staff as offensive coordinator in 2000. When Young retired after the 2004 season, DeBoer succeeded him. According to Morrell, he was offered the opportunity but declined, believing DeBoer was better suited to the role. Morrell continued as defensive coordinator. Over the next five years the Cougars appeared in the playoffs every year, won three NAIA Football National Championships, and lost a fourth. Morell resigned after the 2009 season to become defensive coordinator at South Dakota. DeBoer left a few weeks later to become offensive coordinator at Southern Illinois.

South Dakota was then a member of the Great West Conference, part of the NCAA Division I Football Championship Subdivision. Head coach Ed Meierkort, in the role since 2004, was in his second-to-last season. Morrell spent only one year there before accepting the head coaching job at Montana Tech, an NAIA school. Morrell succeeded Bob Green, who retired after 24 seasons.

Morrell would serve as head coach from 2011 through 2019, compiling an overall record of 52–44. Highlights of his tenure included three appearances in the NAIA playoffs, though Montana Tech never advanced beyond the quarterfinals. He was named the Frontier Conference Coach of the Year three times. Morrell was lured away from Butte, Montana, when Kalen DeBoer, the newly-appointed head coach of Fresno State, offered him the position of defensive backs coach. Morrell commented at the time that "there's only one or two people in the entire world that I would leave Montana Tech to go work for." When DeBoer departed after the 2021 season to become head coach at University of Washington, Morrell went with him as co-defensive coordinator (with William Inge) and safeties coach.

Personal life
Morrell married Jen Van Ballegooyen, a fellow Sioux Falls graduate, in 2001. They have two daughters.

Head coaching record

References

External links
 Fresno State profile

Year of birth missing (living people)
1970s births
Living people
American football defensive backs
Fresno State Bulldogs football coaches
Montana Tech Orediggers athletic directors
Montana Tech Orediggers football coaches
South Dakota Coyotes football coaches
Sioux Falls Cougars football coaches
Sioux Falls Cougars football players
Washington Huskies football coaches
People from Tyndall, South Dakota
Coaches of American football from South Dakota
Players of American football from South Dakota